In the United States, home rule is an authority of a constituent part of a U.S. state to exercise powers of governance delegated to it by its state government. In some states, known as home rule states, the state's constitution grants municipalities and/or counties the ability to pass laws to govern themselves as they see fit (so long as they obey the state and federal constitutions). In other states, only limited authority has been granted to local governments by passage of statutes in the state legislature. In these states, a city or county must obtain permission from the state legislature if it wishes to pass a law or ordinance which is not specifically permitted under existing state legislation.

Forty of the fifty states apply some form of the principle known as Dillon's Rule, which says that local governments may only exercise powers that the state expressly grants to them, to determine the bounds of a municipal government's legal authority. The National League of Cities identifies 31 Dillon's Rule states, 10 home rule states, 8 states that apply Dillon's Rule only to certain municipalities, and one state (Florida) that applies home rule to everything except taxation.  Each state defines for itself what powers it will grant to local governments. Within the local sphere, there are four categories in which the state allows discretionary authority:

Home rule and Dillon's Rule states 
The following chart indicates which of the 50 U.S. states are home rule states and which states obey the legal principle of Dillon's Rule for determining local government authority. A state in this chart with "Limited" home rule may grant home rule to particular cities and municipalities individually but has no constitutional amendment guaranteeing home rule. A state which is both a home rule state and a Dillon's Rule state applies Dillon's Rule to matters or governmental units not accounted for in the constitutional amendment or statutes which grant home rule.

The District of Columbia has a limited form of home rule granted by the Federal Government; see District of Columbia home rule for details.

See also
 District of Columbia home rule
 General-law municipality
 Municipal corporation

References 

Local government in the United States
Urban planning in the United States
State law in the United States